Posht-e Arbaba Rural District is a rural district (dehestan) in Alut District, Baneh County, Kurdistan Province, Iran. At the 2006 census, its population was 5,641, in 1,032 families. The rural district has 44 villages.

See also 
 Mount Arbaba

References 

Rural Districts of Kurdistan Province
Baneh County